is a fictional character and the titular protagonist of the manga series Ranma ½, created by Rumiko Takahashi. Ranma is a Japanese teenage boy who has trained in martial arts since early childhood. As a result of falling into an enchanted spring during a training journey in China, he is cursed to transform into a girl when splashed with cold water, while hot water changes him back into a boy. Throughout the series Ranma seeks out a way to rid himself of the curse, while his friends, enemies, rivals, and many fiancées constantly hinder and interfere.

Creation and conception
Because most of her previous series had female protagonists, Rumiko Takahashi decided that she wanted a male for Ranma ½. However, she was worried about writing a male main character in a magazine targeted toward male readers, and therefore decided to make him half-female. In 1993, an Animerica interviewer asked Takahashi if she intended the sex-changing theme "as an effort to enlighten a male-dominated society." The author said that she does not think in terms of societal agendas and that she created the Ranma ½ concept from wanting "a simple, fun idea." She considered Ranma changing every time he was punched, before deciding on water for initiating his changes after thinking of noren at sentō and making the hot and cold water connection.

Takahashi said she gave the character's name a lot of thought; because the series deals with "a lot of entangled elements in an effective way" she named him Ranma taken from the proverb , which can roughly be translated into English as "tackling plenty of tasks diligently." However, when asked how she came up with it in another interview years later, Takahashi simply said she thought it would be a cute name for either a boy or girl. The manga artist gave Ranma a pigtail to make the character easy to identify regardless of whether he was in his male or female form. Because a pigtail pairs well with Chinese clothes, she then decided to make him a martial artist.

Takahashi said that Ranma's personality ended up different from how she initially intended; "I originally intended for him to be a clean-cut, incredibly energetic kid who was into fighting. But, he became somewhat indecisive and picky." She speculated that, since everyone has those kinds of sentiments, these were her own feelings subconsciously reflected in her character. When Takahashi was asked if there was a connection between the characters Ryunosuke Fujinami and her father from her previous manga Urusei Yatsura and the characters of Ranma and his father Genma, the author said "Perhaps there is something in their relationship, that has crossed over to the relationship between Ranma and Genma. I think that could be true." In 1994, Takahashi said she was planning to have Ranma and Akane Tendo end up together at the end of Ranma ½.

Takahashi sat in on the voice actor auditions for the anime adaptation and, when both male and female Ranma were going to be voiced by the same actor, she insisted that they be voiced by different actors whose gender corresponded to that of the part. In Japanese, Ranma's male form is voiced by Kappei Yamaguchi and his female form by Megumi Hayashibara. The character was Yamaguchi's debut voice acting role. Hayashibara actually auditioned to play Akane Tendo, but was chosen to be the female half of Ranma instead. In English, male Ranma was voiced by Sarah Strange in the OVAs, films and first 64 episodes of the TV anime, before Richard Ian Cox took over the role. The female version of Ranma was voiced in English by Brigitta Dau for only six episodes before she was replaced by Venus Terzo. In the live-action TV film adaptation, male Ranma is portrayed by Kento Kaku and female Ranma by Natsuna Watanabe.

Appearances
When Ranma was a toddler, Genma took him from home and set out on their journey, vowing to his wife that he would make their son a "true man among men." As such Ranma does not even remember his mother. While training in the Bayankala Mountain Range in the Qinghai Province of China, Ranma and Genma fell into cursed springs at Jusenkyo. When someone falls into a cursed spring, they take the physical form of whatever drowned there thousands of years ago whenever they come into contact with cold water. The curse will revert when exposed to hot water until their next cold water exposure. Ranma fell into the spring of a drowned girl, while Genma fell into the spring of a drowned panda bear.

Two weeks after the accident, they move in with Genma's old friend Soun Tendo at his Nerima, Tokyo home, with the expectation that one of his three daughters will marry Ranma. The eldest Kasumi and middle sibling Nabiki force their little sister Akane to accept the betrothal. Akane and Ranma instantly dislike each other due to Akane's mistrust of boys and Ranma's derision of her, but they drift closer throughout the series, each going to great lengths to save the other when in trouble. Ranma enrolls in Furinkan High School where he meets Tatewaki Kuno, the arrogant captain of the kendo club who is in love with Akane and who also falls in love with Ranma's female form, never realizing that she and male Ranma are the same person. Additionally, Kuno's younger sister, the gymnast Kodachi, soon develops a crush on the male Ranma.

Ranma's childhood rival, the perpetually lost Ryoga Hibiki, finds his way to Nerima seeking revenge on him as he is cursed to turn into a small black piglet after falling in a cursed spring when he followed Ranma to China. Ryoga comes to also see Ranma as a rival in love, as he develops a crush on Akane. When Ranma was in China, he defeated Chinese Amazon Shampoo in combat while in his female form. Shampoo's local custom dictates that female warriors kill the woman that defeats them, as such she tracks Ranma to Nerima. However, she is then defeated by Ranma again in his male form, and Chinese Amazon custom demands that female warriors marry the man that defeats them, as such Shampoo pursues male Ranma as her fiancé.

Ukyo Kuonji, an okonomiyaki chef and Ranma's childhood friend, also appears in town seeking revenge. While on a training journey with a young Ranma, Genma agreed to have his son marry Ukyo in an arranged marriage with her family's okonomiyaki cart acting as the dowry, but he took the cart and left Ukyo behind. For the next ten years Ukyo rejected her femininity and trained to get revenge on the Saotomes. As children, Ranma did not know that Ukyo was female and when he finds out he calls her "cute," which causes Ukyo to forgive the past and treat Ranma as her fiancé.

Although Ranma despises his sex-changing curse, he is not beyond using it to his advantage. In order to interfere on Ryoga's date with Akane, Ranma tricks his gullible rival into thinking his female form is the younger sister Ryoga never knew, Yoiko. When Ranma's mother Nodoka comes to town and Ranma learns that his father promised her that he and his son would commit suicide via seppuku if he failed to raise Ranma into a "true man among men," Ranma passes himself off as Ranko, Akane's tomboy cousin, while Genma pretends to be Ranko's pet panda. When Nodoka finally does learn that "Ranko" is Ranma, she waives demanding seppuku and remarks that even as Ranko her son acted "manly." However, she does grab her katana whenever she sees him doing something that could be misunderstood as feminine.

Reception

In both 1990 and 1991, Ranma came in second place in Animages annual Anime Grand Prix for Favorite Male Character and fourth in its Favorite Female Character category. Male Ranma dropped one spot to third place in 1992, while female Ranma fell to seventh. Male Ranma regained second place in 1993, but his female form fell to 12th. In 1994, Ranma came in 15th place in the male category. A 2019 NHK poll of 210,061 people saw Ranma voted the fifth favorite character from all of Rumiko Takahashi's works. In a poll conducted by goo, fans voted female Ranma their third favorite anime role performed by Megumi Hayashibara. With 18.1% of the vote, female Ranma came in first in a goo poll of 250 men and 250 women on "cute redhead girl" anime characters. Anime News Network's Gia Manry listed Ranma's engagement to Shampoo as the third Most Awkward Proposal in anime.

Rebecca Silverman of Anime News Network called Ranma the "least formed" character of the series as of the first two volumes of the manga. She wrote that "at first he feels badly about his affliction [and] how it affects others, but by the middle of the book he's started using it to his advantage, and really, it's hard to blame him there." and noted that Ranma clearly likes Akane much more than she likes him. Her colleague Theron Martin wrote that Ranma and Akane are "firmly anchored in the territory of clearly caring about each other even though they do not want to admit it." Todd Douglass Jr. of DVD Talk wrote that seeing their developing relationship is one of the initial hooks of the anime and is truly entertaining. The Fandom Posts Kory Cerjak called the "not-so-relationship" a constant form of entertainment due to "how they interact when they’re hating each other and when they’re being smitten." Commenting on how many people feel the ending of Ranma ½ does not resolve anything, Jason Thompson wrote that "expecting to see Ranma marry Akane is like expecting to see Uncle Scrooge marry Glitterin' Goldie or Archie marry Veronica [...] it just doesn't happen."

Martin called Venus Terzo's English performance as female Ranma a vast improvement over Brigitta Dau's and said it elevates the rest of the dub to an overall acceptable level. He wrote that the change was supposedly done due to fan complaints, which he called "entirely believable" given how "grating" Dau's performance is. Martin wrote that the English voice actor change from Sarah Strange as male Ranma to Richard Ian Cox takes some time to get used to due to how substantially it alters Ranma's voice and delivery.

References

Comics characters introduced in 1987
Fictional Japanese people in anime and manga
Fictional male martial artists
Fictional female martial artists
Male characters in anime and manga
Female characters in anime and manga
Martial artist characters in anime and manga
Ranma ½
Shapeshifter characters in comics
Teenage characters in anime and manga